Theodorus Amandus Maria van de Sande (born 10 May 1947) is a Dutch cinematographer.

He graduated from the Netherlands Filmacademy in Amsterdam in 1970, and has been working as a cinematographer since 1972.

He won Golden Calf for Best Cinematography in 1982 and 1987.

He has been a member of the American Society of Cinematographers since 1991.

Selected filmography

Film

Television

References

External links 
Official Site

Theo van de Sande - cinematographers.nl

1947 births
Dutch cinematographers
Dutch emigrants to the United States
Living people
People from Tilburg
20th-century Dutch people